James Lyman Price (September 20, 1847 – October 24, 1925) was a manager in Major League Baseball. In the  season, with the New York Gothams he was the club's manager. During his lone season as manager, he led the Gothams to 56 wins, with 42 losses in 100 games. He died in Oak Park, Illinois in 1925.

See also
San Francisco Giants general managers and managers

External links
Baseball-Reference manager page

1847 births
1925 deaths
New York Gothams managers